Lygophis elegantissimus is a species of snake in the family Colubridae.  The species is native to Argentina.

References

Lygophis
Snakes of South America
Reptiles of Argentina
Endemic fauna of Argentina
Reptiles described in 1896